The Marble Colossus (Spanish:El coloso de mármol) is a 1929 Mexican silent drama film directed by Manuel R. Ojeda and starring  Ojeda, Anita Ruiz and Carlos Villatoro.

Cast
 Manuel R. Ojeda 
 Anita Ruiz
 Carlos Villatoro

References

Bibliography
 Federico Dávalos Orozco & Esperanza Vázquez Bernal. Filmografía General Del Cine Mexicano, 1906-1931. Universidad Autónoma de Puebla, 1985.

External links 
 

1929 films
1929 drama films
Mexican silent films
Mexican drama films
1920s Spanish-language films
Films directed by Manuel R. Ojeda
Mexican black-and-white films
Silent drama films